William Bernard Ullathorne  (7 May 180621 March 1889) was an English prelate who held high offices in the Roman Catholic Church during the nineteenth century.

Early life
Ullathorne was born  in Pocklington, East Riding of Yorkshire, the eldest of ten children of William Ullathorne, a prosperous businessman with interests in groceries, draperies and spirits, and Hannah (née Longstaff), who converted to Roman Catholicism when she married. When he was nine years of age, Ullathorne's family relocated to Scarborough, where he began his schooling.  He was a descendant of Saint Thomas More through his great-grandmother, Mary More.

At 12 he was taken from school and placed in his father's office to learn the management of accounts. The intention was to send him to school again, but Ullathorne wished to go to sea, and at the age of 15, with his parents' permission, he made the first of several voyages to the Baltic Sea and Mediterranean. While attending Mass in Memel he experienced something in the nature of a conversion, and on his return asked the mate if he had any religious books. Ullathorne was given a translation of Marsollier's Life of St Jane Frances de Chantal, which deepened his religious devotion. At the end of this voyage he returned home. In February 1823, aged 16, he was sent to Downside School, near Bath, where he was mentored by John Bede Polding, afterwards the first Archbishop of Sydney, who influenced him greatly.

Priesthood
In 1823 Ullathorne entered the monastery of Downside Abbey, taking the vows in 1825, taking the additional name "Bernard", after Bernard of Clairvaux. He was ordained priest in 1831, and in 1832 went to New South Wales as vicar-general to Bishop William Placid Morris (1794–1872), whose jurisdiction extended over the Australian missions. It was mainly Ullathorne who caused Pope Gregory XVI to establish the hierarchy in Australia. In 1836, Bede Polding sent Ullathorne back to Britain, to recruit more Benedictines. While in England, he visited Ireland, where he met Mary Aikenhead. He returned to Australia in 1838 with five Sisters of Charity. Ullathorne returned to England in 1841, suffering what Judith F Champ says would in modern terminology be described as "burnout". He then took charge of the Roman Catholic mission at Coventry, where he recovered his health and spirits.

Ullathorne had turned down bishoprics in Hobart, Adelaide, and Perth as he did not wish to return to Australia, but in 1847 he was consecrated bishop as Vicar Apostolic of the Western District, in succession to Bishop C.M. Baggs (1806–1845), but was transferred to the Central District in the following year. Ullathorne helped found St Osburg's Church in Coventry.

Bishop of Birmingham
On the re-establishment of the hierarchy in England and Wales, he became the first Roman Catholic Bishop of the Diocese of Birmingham. During his nearly four decades of tenure at the see 67 new churches, 32 convents and nearly 200 mission schools were built. In 1888 he retired and received from Pope Leo XIII the honorary title of Archbishop of Cabasa. He died at Oscott College and his monument is in the crypt of St. Chad's Cathedral, Birmingham, although he was buried in the sanctuary of the Church of St Dominic and the Immaculate Conception at Stone, Staffordshire. There is Bishop Ullathorne RC School in Coventry which is named after him.

Of Ullathorne's theological and philosophical works the best known are The Endowments of Man (1882); The Groundwork of the Christian Virtues (1883); Christian Patience (1886). For an account of his life see his Autobiography, edited by A. T. Drane (London).

Notes

References

 
 
 T. L. Suttor, 'Ullathorne, William Bernard (1806–1889)', Australian Dictionary of Biography, Vol. 2, MUP, 1967, pp 544–546; retrieved 15 October 2009
 
 
 "The autobiography of Archbishop Ullathorne : with selections from his letters" at Archive.org

External links
 
 

1806 births
1889 deaths
19th-century Roman Catholic archbishops in the United Kingdom
Australian Roman Catholic priests
19th-century Roman Catholic bishops in England
Roman Catholic archbishops of Birmingham
English Benedictines
Benedictine bishops
People educated at Downside School
Our Lady of La Salette
People from Pocklington
Apostolic vicars of England and Wales
People from Scarborough, North Yorkshire